Marah Rabah is a Palestinian village located twelve kilometers south of Bethlehem. The village is in the Bethlehem Governorate central West Bank. According to the Palestinian Central Bureau of Statistics, the town had a population of over 1,320 in 2007. The primary healthcare is obtained in Tuqu', where the Ministry of Health denotes the healthcare facilities as level 2.

History

British Mandate  era
In the 1931 census the population of Marah Rabah was counted together with Beit Fajjar, Marah Ma'alla and Umm Salamuna. The total population was 1,043, all Muslims, living in 258 houses.

Jordanian era
In the wake of the 1948 Arab–Israeli War, and after the 1949 Armistice Agreements, Marah Rabah came under  Jordanian rule.
In 1961, the population of Murah Rabah was 198.

Post 1967
Since the Six-Day War in 1967, Marah Rabah has been held under Israeli occupation.

Footnotes

Bibliography

External links
Marah Rabah village (fact sheet), Applied Research Institute–Jerusalem, ARIJ
Marah Rabah village profile, ARIJ(See talk:  maps are wrong)
   Marah Rabah aerial photo, ARIJ
The priorities and needs for development in Marah Rabah village based on the community and local authorities' assessment, ARIJ

Towns in the West Bank
Bethlehem Governorate
Municipalities of the State of Palestine